Bintang Mahaputra Adipurna is Bintang Mahaputra Class I.

The star was the highest civilian award, but was issued and awarded after the Star of the Republic of Indonesia to members of the military corps. This star is awarded to those who are extraordinarily meritorious in the military field as well.

List of recipients 
 Abdurrahman Wahid
 Adam Malik
 Agus Salim
 Akihito
 Bacharuddin Jusuf Habibie
 Hamzah Haz
 Hasri Ainun Besari Habibie
 Ki Hajar Dewantara
 Megawati Sukarnoputri
 Prince Sambernyowo (KGPAA Mangkunegoro I)
 Suharto
 Sukarno
 Sri Sultan Hamengkubuwana IX
 Sudharmono
 Sudirman
 Try Sutrisno
 Willem-Alexander

References 

Orders, decorations, and medals of Indonesia